Odir Jacques Ferreira (born April 2, 1946) is a retired Brazilian soccer striker who played most of his career in Costa Rica.

Club career

El Salvador
Before moving to Costa Rica, Jacques Ferreira started at Bangu in Brazil's Carioca League, then played for several years in El Salvador with Club Deportivo FAS. Although he failed to win any trophies in his time with FAS, he did help them to reach the championship final for three consecutive seasons in 1967/68, 1969 and 1970. He was very well known and popular with the club's supporters as he was a very effective and consistent striker. In his few years in El Salvador he scored a total of 126 goals, and is currently still listed as one of the highest goalscorers of all time. He holds a scoring record still remaining untouched, scoring 30 goals in 36 games in 1968 with Alianza.

Costa Rica
From FAS, Ferreira moved to Saprissa, where he won several national championships, including the famous six consecutive championships won by Saprissa from 1972 to 1977, a record both in Costa Rica as well as in the American continent. He also played with Alajuelense and Herediano, before retiring at age 33.

Jacques was an excellent goal scorer, very quick and gifted, with great skills for shooting especially free kicks. He is always remembered by Saprissa's fans, because of his unique talents.

He was the best goal scorer in the 1972 Costa Rica's first division tournament, in which he scored 18 goals. He scored 5 goals in one game against Puntarenas in May 1972. He totalled 82 goals in the Costa Rican top tier.

He is considered by many experts, as the best foreigner to ever play in the Costa Rica's first division.

Managerial career
After retiring, he began a very successful coaching career in Costa Rica, where he managed the three most important teams in the country, Deportivo Saprissa, Alajuelense and Herediano, becoming the only person to win a championship as a player and as a coach at the same time with Herediano in 1978. He won 3 championships with Herediano and 1 championship with Alajuelense under his coaching tenure. He also coached the Costa Rica's national squad in 1985. As a coach, he discovered Costa Rica national team player greats such as Oscar Ramirez, Rolando Fonseca and Mauricio Wright among others. He had a spell again in El Salvador with FAS whom he joined in June 2000 before returning to Costa Rica where he was dismissed by Municipal Liberia in March 2005.

In January 2006 he moved to El Salvador again to take charge at Alianza. He retook the reigns at Herediano in March 2012, left them for Cartaginés in August 2012 and coached them into the middle of 2013. Later that year he coached Perez Zeledón in the playoffs.Odir Jacques es el nuevo técnico de Pérez Zeledón – Nación </ref> but on already in May 2013 after only 4 games in the dug out.

Jacques is the manager who led Herediano during the most matches, 234 in total and has the highest win percentage of any coach in Herediano's history leading the red and yellow squad to an unprecedented 5 championships (most by any coach in the franchise history).

Personal life
He met his wife Ana Cecilia in El Salvador and they have three children.

References

1946 births
Living people
Sportspeople from Rio de Janeiro (state)
Brazilian emigrants to Costa Rica
Association football forwards
Brazilian footballers
Brazilian expatriate footballers
Brazilian football managers
Alianza F.C. footballers
C.D. FAS footballers
C.D. Atlético Marte footballers
Deportivo Saprissa players
L.D. Alajuelense footballers
C.S. Herediano footballers
Liga FPD players
Expatriate footballers in El Salvador
Costa Rican football managers
L.D. Alajuelense managers
C.S. Herediano managers
C.D. FAS managers
Deportivo Saprissa managers
Costa Rica national football team managers
Expatriate football managers in El Salvador
Expatriate football managers in Costa Rica
Brazilian expatriate sportspeople in El Salvador
Brazilian expatriate sportspeople in Costa Rica